Asociația Club Sportiv Mediaș 2022, commonly known as ACS Mediaș, or simply as Mediaș, is a Romanian football club based in Mediaș, Sibiu County, which competes in the Liga IV.

It was founded in 2022, as a phoenix club of Gaz Metan Mediaș which was dissolved in the same summer, due to financial issues. The owners of the new entity are former players and coaches of Gaz Metan who want to continue the football tradition in the city, and also regain the name, crest and records of the defunct club. The nine founding members are Ionuț Buzean, Cristian Pustai, Doru Dudiță, Eric de Oliveira, Claudiu Boaru, Costel Hanc, Eugen Pîrvulescu, Iosif Biro and Dorin Roșca.

Support
ACS Mediaș supporters are in fact the supporter of former Gaz Metan Mediaș and has many supporters in Mediaș and especially in Sibiu County. The ultras groups of ACS Mediaș are known as Lupii Negri (The Black Wolves) and Commando Mediensis, former ultras groups of defunct Gaz Metan

Rivalries
The most important rivalries for ACS Mediaș are against football clubs from Sibiu, such as: Inter Sibiu, Voința Sibiu or FC Hermannstadt.

Players

First team squad

Club Officials

Board of directors

Current technical staff

References

External links

Association football clubs established in 2022
Football clubs in Romania
Football clubs in Sibiu County
Liga IV clubs
2022 establishments in Romania